Alice Sakitnak Akammak (born 1940 in Nunavut) is an Inuit artist.

Exhibitions
1992 Women of the North: An Exhibition of art by Inuit Women of the Canadian Arctic, Marion Scott Gallery, Vancouver
1993 The Treasured Monument, Marion Scott Gallery, Vancouver
2015  Dressing It Up: Beadwork in Northern Communities, Peary-MacMillan Arctic Museum

Collections
Her work is included in the collections of the Winnipeg Art Gallery, the Canadian Museum of History, Musée national des beaux-arts du Québec, the Art Gallery of Guelph and  the McMichael Canadian Art Collection

Akammak also has work in stone, fibers, skin and beads in the collection of the University of Saskatchewan, and a work in carved stone and glass beads in the collection of the Peary-MacMillan Arctic Museum at Bowdoin College.

References

1940 births
20th-century Canadian women artists
21st-century Canadian women artists
Living people
Inuit artists